Gymnastics were contested at the 2001 Mediterranean Games.

Medal winners

Men's

Women's

Medal table

References
 Complete 2001 Mediterranean Games Standings

2001 Mediterranean Games
Sports at the 2001 Mediterranean Games
2001 artistic gymnastics
Mediterranean Games
Gymnastics in Tunisia